Glenwood Aerodrome  is a registered aerodrome located  south southeast of Glenwood, Alberta, Canada.

References

Registered aerodromes in Alberta
Buildings and structures in Cardston County